The Obninsk constituency (No.99) is a Russian legislative constituency in Kaluga Oblast. Until 2007 the constituency covered western Kaluga Oblast. However, in 2016 the constituency changed significantly as it switched near all of its territory with Kaluga constituency (but retained Obninsk), so currently Obninsk constituency is based in eastern Kaluga Oblast.

Members elected

Election results

1993

|-
! colspan=2 style="background-color:#E9E9E9;text-align:left;vertical-align:top;" |Candidate
! style="background-color:#E9E9E9;text-align:left;vertical-align:top;" |Party
! style="background-color:#E9E9E9;text-align:right;" |Votes
! style="background-color:#E9E9E9;text-align:right;" |%
|-
|style="background-color:"|
|align=left|Pavel Burdukov
|align=left|Agrarian Party
|
|12.61%
|-
|style="background-color:"|
|align=left|Anatoly Mitryashkin
|align=left|Independent
| -
|12.56%
|-
| colspan="5" style="background-color:#E9E9E9;"|
|- style="font-weight:bold"
| colspan="3" style="text-align:left;" | Total
| 
| 100%
|-
| colspan="5" style="background-color:#E9E9E9;"|
|- style="font-weight:bold"
| colspan="4" |Source:
|
|}

1995

|-
! colspan=2 style="background-color:#E9E9E9;text-align:left;vertical-align:top;" |Candidate
! style="background-color:#E9E9E9;text-align:left;vertical-align:top;" |Party
! style="background-color:#E9E9E9;text-align:right;" |Votes
! style="background-color:#E9E9E9;text-align:right;" |%
|-
|style="background-color:"|
|align=left|Pavel Burdukov (incumbent)
|align=left|Agrarian Party
|
|18.16%
|-
|style="background-color:"|
|align=left|Viktor Baburin
|align=left|Our Home – Russia
|
|11.85%
|-
|style="background-color:"|
|align=left|Grigory Nikishkin
|align=left|Independent
|
|9.99%
|-
|style="background-color:#F21A29"|
|align=left|Anatoly Poddubny
|align=left|Trade Unions and Industrialists – Union of Labour
|
|9.87%
|-
|style="background-color:"|
|align=left|Anatoly Mitryashkin
|align=left|Independent
|
|7.97%
|-
|style="background-color:#2C299A"|
|align=left|Gennady Sklyar
|align=left|Congress of Russian Communities
|
|7.94%
|-
|style="background-color:"|
|align=left|Nina Illarionova
|align=left|Union of Communists
|
|4.46%
|-
|style="background:#E98282"| 
|align=left|Raisa Skripitsyna
|align=left|Women of Russia
|
|4.27%
|-
|style="background-color:"|
|align=left|Aleksandr Morozov
|align=left|Yabloko
|
|4.10%
|-
|style="background-color:"|
|align=left|Aleksey Yezhukov
|align=left|Independent
|
|2.28%
|-
|style="background-color:"|
|align=left|Aleksandr Vasyutin
|align=left|Independent
|
|2.04%
|-
|style="background-color:#FF4400"|
|align=left|Eduard Samoylov
|align=left|Party of Workers' Self-Government
|
|1.59%
|-
|style="background-color:"|
|align=left|Aleksandr Ushakov
|align=left|Independent
|
|1.36%
|-
|style="background-color:"|
|align=left|Marina Khomenko
|align=left|Education — Future of Russia
|
|0.99%
|-
|style="background-color:#3C3E42"|
|align=left|Sergey Sharshakov
|align=left|Duma-96
|
|0.67%
|-
|style="background-color:#000000"|
|colspan=2 |against all
|
|7.92%
|-
| colspan="5" style="background-color:#E9E9E9;"|
|- style="font-weight:bold"
| colspan="3" style="text-align:left;" | Total
| 
| 100%
|-
| colspan="5" style="background-color:#E9E9E9;"|
|- style="font-weight:bold"
| colspan="4" |Source:
|
|}

1999

|-
! colspan=2 style="background-color:#E9E9E9;text-align:left;vertical-align:top;" |Candidate
! style="background-color:#E9E9E9;text-align:left;vertical-align:top;" |Party
! style="background-color:#E9E9E9;text-align:right;" |Votes
! style="background-color:#E9E9E9;text-align:right;" |%
|-
|style="background-color:"|
|align=left|Pavel Burdukov (incumbent)
|align=left|Communist Party
|
|20.30%
|-
|style="background-color:"|
|align=left|Semyon Shershnev
|align=left|Independent
|
|19.08%
|-
|style="background-color:"|
|align=left|Vladimir Bogomolov
|align=left|Independent
|
|13.08%
|-
|style="background-color:"|
|align=left|Mikhail Glazunov
|align=left|Independent
|
|9.98%
|-
|style="background-color:"|
|align=left|Vasily Churin
|align=left|Independent
|
|6.71%
|-
|style="background-color:#1042A5"|
|align=left|Tatyana Kotlyar
|align=left|Union of Right Forces
|
|6.18%
|-
|style="background-color:"|
|align=left|Vyacheslav Mikhaylov
|align=left|Yabloko
|
|3.22%
|-
|style="background-color:"|
|align=left|Viktor Konstantinov
|align=left|Independent
|
|3.03%
|-
|style="background-color:#FF4400"|
|align=left|Aleksandr Tereshchenko
|align=left|Andrey Nikolayev and Svyatoslav Fyodorov Bloc
|
|2.93%
|-
|style="background-color:"|
|align=left|Igor Dyumin
|align=left|Liberal Democratic Party
|
|1.59%
|-
|style="background-color:#084284"|
|align=left|Vladimir Bogdanov
|align=left|Spiritual Heritage
|
|1.40%
|-
|style="background-color:"|
|align=left|Yury Podtikhov
|align=left|Kedr
|
|0.92%
|-
|style="background-color:#000000"|
|colspan=2 |against all
|
|9.80%
|-
| colspan="5" style="background-color:#E9E9E9;"|
|- style="font-weight:bold"
| colspan="3" style="text-align:left;" | Total
| 
| 100%
|-
| colspan="5" style="background-color:#E9E9E9;"|
|- style="font-weight:bold"
| colspan="4" |Source:
|
|}

2003

|-
! colspan=2 style="background-color:#E9E9E9;text-align:left;vertical-align:top;" |Candidate
! style="background-color:#E9E9E9;text-align:left;vertical-align:top;" |Party
! style="background-color:#E9E9E9;text-align:right;" |Votes
! style="background-color:#E9E9E9;text-align:right;" |%
|-
|style="background-color:"|
|align=left|Viktor Kolesnikov
|align=left|Independent
|
|30.39%
|-
|style="background-color:"|
|align=left|Pavel Burdukov (incumbent)
|align=left|Agrarian Party
|
|26.21%
|-
|style="background-color:#1042A5"|
|align=left|Tatyana Kotlyar
|align=left|Union of Right Forces
|
|16.85%
|-
|style="background-color:"|
|align=left|Nikolay Kuznetsov
|align=left|Liberal Democratic Party
|
|6.90%
|-
|style="background-color:#408080"|
|align=left|Igor Lizunov
|align=left|For a Holy Russia
|
|2.74%
|-
|style="background-color:#7C73CC"|
|align=left|Vladimir Makhtey
|align=left|Great Russia – Eurasian Union
|
|1.64%
|-
|style="background-color:#000000"|
|colspan=2 |against all
|
|13.46%
|-
| colspan="5" style="background-color:#E9E9E9;"|
|- style="font-weight:bold"
| colspan="3" style="text-align:left;" | Total
| 
| 100%
|-
| colspan="5" style="background-color:#E9E9E9;"|
|- style="font-weight:bold"
| colspan="4" |Source:
|
|}

2016

|-
! colspan=2 style="background-color:#E9E9E9;text-align:left;vertical-align:top;" |Candidate
! style="background-color:#E9E9E9;text-align:left;vertical-align:top;" |Party
! style="background-color:#E9E9E9;text-align:right;" |Votes
! style="background-color:#E9E9E9;text-align:right;" |%
|-
|style="background-color: " |
|align=left|Gennady Sklyar
|align=left|United Russia
|
|45.35%
|-
|style="background-color:"|
|align=left|Marina Kostina
|align=left|Communist Party
|
|19.13%
|-
|style="background-color:"|
|align=left|Vadim Dengin
|align=left|Liberal Democratic Party
|
|13.10%
|-
|style="background-color:"|
|align=left|Aleksandr Trushkov
|align=left|A Just Russia
|
|7.49%
|-
|style="background-color:"|
|align=left|Anton Vasilyev
|align=left|Patriots of Russia
|
|4.17%
|-
|style="background:"| 
|align=left|Oleg Ovsyannikov
|align=left|Yabloko
|
|3.72%
|-
|style="background:"| 
|align=left|Sergey Dondo
|align=left|Communists of Russia
|
|3.56%
|-
| colspan="5" style="background-color:#E9E9E9;"|
|- style="font-weight:bold"
| colspan="3" style="text-align:left;" | Total
| 
| 100%
|-
| colspan="5" style="background-color:#E9E9E9;"|
|- style="font-weight:bold"
| colspan="4" |Source:
|
|}

2021

|-
! colspan=2 style="background-color:#E9E9E9;text-align:left;vertical-align:top;" |Candidate
! style="background-color:#E9E9E9;text-align:left;vertical-align:top;" |Party
! style="background-color:#E9E9E9;text-align:right;" |Votes
! style="background-color:#E9E9E9;text-align:right;" |%
|-
|style="background-color: " |
|align=left|Gennady Sklyar (incumbent)
|align=left|United Russia
|
|33.19%
|-
|style="background-color:"|
|align=left|Nikolay Ivanov
|align=left|Communist Party
|
|18.66%
|-
|style="background-color:"|
|align=left|Nadezhda Yefremova
|align=left|A Just Russia — For Truth
|
|14.34%
|-
|style="background-color: " |
|align=left|Marina Arkhitova
|align=left|New People
|
|9.92%
|-
|style="background-color: "|
|align=left|Natalya Terekhova
|align=left|Party of Pensioners
|
|8.90%
|-
|style="background-color:"|
|align=left|Dmitry Lozenko
|align=left|Liberal Democratic Party
|
|5.91%
|-
|style="background-color:"|
|align=left|Vladimir Yefremov
|align=left|The Greens
|
|2.71%
|-
|style="background:"| 
|align=left|Oleg Luzhetsky
|align=left|Yabloko
|
|1.80%
|-
| colspan="5" style="background-color:#E9E9E9;"|
|- style="font-weight:bold"
| colspan="3" style="text-align:left;" | Total
| 
| 100%
|-
| colspan="5" style="background-color:#E9E9E9;"|
|- style="font-weight:bold"
| colspan="4" |Source:
|
|}

Notes

References

Russian legislative constituencies
Politics of Kaluga Oblast